Gibanica is a traditional pastry dish popular all over the Balkans. It is usually made with cottage cheese and eggs. Recipes can range from sweet to savoury, and from simple to festive and elaborate multi-layered cakes.

A derivative of the Serbo-Croatian verb gibati/гибати meaning "to fold; sway, swing, rock", the pastry was mentioned in Vuk Stefanović Karadžić's Serbian Dictionary in 1818 and by a Slovenian priest Jožef Kosič in 1828, where it was described as a special Slovenian cake which is "a must at wedding festivities and is also served to workers after finishing a big project". It is a type of layered strudel, a combination of Turkish and Austrian influences in different cuisines of the former Yugoslavia. Today the versions of this cake can be found in Slovenia, Croatia, Serbia, Bosnia, and other regions of the former Yugoslavia. Variants of this rich layered strudel are found in Hungary, Bulgaria, North Macedonia, Greece, Turkey, and Syria.

Gibanica may sometimes also refer to a walnut roll, which is a sweet bread with a spiral of walnut paste rolled up inside.

Etymology
In the vocabulary of the Yugoslav Academy, as well as in the etymological dictionary of Slavic languages, the word gibanica is a derivative of the Serbo-Croatian verb gíbati/гибати, which means "to fold; sway, swing, rock". There are also derivatives like the word /гибаничар – one who makes gibanica, one who loves to eat gibanica, and one who always imposes as a guest and at someone else's expense. Some believe that the word gibanica actually comes from the Egyptian Arabic gebna (جبنة), a type of soft white salty cheese used in making gibanica.

Preparation
The original recipe for Gibanica included traditionally homemade Phyllo dough and cow's milk cheese. Homemade cheese can be feta or sirene. The pie is usually made as gužvara (crumpled pie), so the phyllo dough in the middle is crumpled and filled. Besides cheese, the fill contains eggs, milk, kaymak, lard, salt and water. Also, stuffing may include spinach, meat, nettle, potato and onion. To speed up preparation, phyllo dough from a store can be used and sunflower oil or olive oil can be used instead of lard.

Variants

Many varieties of Gibanica and related dishes can be found throughout the Balkans; different gibanica are known as part of the national cuisines of Bosnia and Herzegovina, Croatia, Serbia, Slovenia, and Friuli-Venezia Giulia (Italy, where it is called ghibanizza), Greece, North Macedonia and Bulgaria, where it is usually called Banitsa. Recipes can range from sweet to savoury, and from simple to festive and elaborate multi-layered cakes. The so-called "Chetnik Gibanica" is the fatter, greasier version; it received the name after World War II.

From the basic recipe, many local specialties have evolved. Prekmurska gibanica, for example, is a "fancy" multi-layered cake from Prekmurje in Slovenia, served as a dessert course on festive occasions. Međimurska gibanica, from the neighbouring Međimurje region of Croatia, is a closely related but simpler and less "formal" dish consisting of four layers of fillings (prepared fresh cheese (quark), poppyseed, apple and walnut). Another gibanica variety, called Prleška gibanica, is known from Prlekija to the west of the Mur River.

The basic concept of Gibanica, a cake or pie involving a combination of pastry with cheese in differentiated layers often combined with layers of various other fillings, is common in the cuisines of the Balkans, Anatolia, and the Eastern Mediterranean. For example, a similar dish known as Shabiyat (Sh'abiyat, Shaabiyat) is part of the cuisine of Syria and Lebanon. Gibanica can also be considered to resemble a type of cheese strudel, with which it likely shares a common ancestry in the pastry dishes of the region, and the cuisines of the Byzantine and Ottoman empires.

In culture

Gibanica is one of the most popular and recognizable pastry dishes from the Balkans, whether served on festive occasions, or as a comforting family snack. In Serbia, the dish is eaten as breakfast, dinner, appetizer and snack, and is often consumed at traditional events such as Christmas, Easter and Slava. The largest Gibanica ever made was in the town of Mionica in 2007. It weighed over 1,000 kg, and was applied for inclusion in the Guinness Book of Records. Around 330 kg of phyllo dough, 330 kg of cheese, 3,300 eggs, 30 L of oil, 110 L of mineral water, 50 kg of lard and 500 packets of baking powder went into its creation. In Slovenia, Croatia and Serbia there are festivals dedicated to gibanica. One of them, called the Gibanica festival or Days of Banitsa, is held each year in Bela Palanka. It first took place in 2005. The Slovenian festival of Prekmurska gibanica and ham is held in the Slovenian region of Prekmurje, and the Croatian festival of gibanica is held in Igrišće in Hrvatsko Zagorje.

See also
Banitsa

References

Sources

External links

Balkan cuisine
Slavic cuisine
Mediterranean cuisine
Bread dishes
Pastries
Savoury pies
Pies
Cheese dishes
Egg dishes
National dishes